Joseph Reynders (born 16 December 1929) is a Belgian former swimmer. He competed in the men's 1500 metre freestyle at the 1948 Summer Olympics and the water polo tournament at the 1952 Summer Olympics.

References

External links
 

1929 births
Possibly living people
Belgian male water polo players
Olympic swimmers of Belgium
Olympic water polo players of Belgium
Swimmers at the 1948 Summer Olympics
Water polo players at the 1952 Summer Olympics
Swimmers from Antwerp
Belgian male freestyle swimmers
20th-century Belgian people